A poetry book by Alejandro Carrión named  La sangre sobre la tierra is an excursion into epic poetry that begins with the “Canto a la América Española”, written to participate in a continent wide poetry competition convened in Mexico: the poem was short listed as the “Ecuadorian” selection and lost by one vote to the great Venezuelan poet Manuel Felipe Rugeles. “Canto a la línea equinoccial” pleased the publishers of “Poesía de América”, the Mexican poetry magazine, but caused the indignation of the poet Elio Romero, who found it ‘reactionary’.  Jose Maria Egas expressed his enthusiasm for the agonic sacrifices of “Túmulo de Vargas Torres”.

Ecuadorian poetry collections